Riverview High School or River View High School may refer to:

Canada 
Riverview High School (New Brunswick), Riverview, New Brunswick
Riverview Rural High School, Coxheath, Nova Scotia

United States 
Riverview High School (Arizona), Mesa, Arizona
Riverview High School (Arkansas), Searcy, Arkansas
Riverview High School (Riverview, Florida), Riverview, Florida
Riverview High School (Sarasota, Florida), Sarasota, Florida
Riverview School, East Sandwich, Massachusetts
Riverview Community High School, Riverview, Michigan
River View High School (Ohio), Warsaw, Ohio
Riverview High School (Pennsylvania), Oakmont, Pennsylvania
River View High School (Washington), Kennewick, Washington
River View High School (West Virginia), Bradshaw, West Virginia